Han Xu is the name of:

Han Xu (韩叙; 1924–1994), Chinese ambassador to the United States
Han Xu (footballer, born 1973) (韩旭; born 1973), Chinese footballer
Han Xu (footballer, born 1988) (韩旭; born 1988), Chinese footballer
Han Xu (basketball) (韩旭; born 1999), Chinese basketball player

See also
Han Xue (disambiguation)